Lavoy is a hamlet in Alberta, Canada. Lavoy or LaVoy may also refer to:
 Bill LaVoy (born 1967), a member of the Michigan House of Representatives
 Bob Lavoy (1926–2010), an American basketball player and coach
 January LaVoy, an American actress
 Lavoy Allen (born 1989), an American basketball player
 Robert LaVoy Finicum, one of the leaders of the 2016 occupation of the Malheur National Wildlife Refuge (killed by Oregon State Police)